Skeleton at the 2014 Winter Olympics was held at the Sliding Center Sanki near Krasnaya Polyana, Russia. The events were held between 13 and 15 February 2014. A total of two skeleton events were held.

Competition schedule
The following is the competition schedule for all events.

All times are (UTC+4).

Medal summary

Medal table

Medalist

 On 22 November 2017, gold medalist Aleksandr Tretyakov was stripped of his gold medal. On 1 February 2018, his results were restored as a result of the successful appeal.
  On 22 November 2017, bronze medalist Elena Nikitina was stripped of her medal. On 1 February 2018, her results were restored as a result of the successful appeal.

Qualification

A total of 50 quota spots were availabled to athletes to compete at the games. A maximum 30 men and 20 women might qualify. The qualification was based on the world rankings of 19 January 2014.

Participating nations
47 athletes from 17 nations participated, with number of athletes in parentheses.

References

External links
Official Results Book – Skeleton

 
2014
2014 Winter Olympics events
2014 in skeleton
Skeleton competitions in Russia